The 2023 Conference USA Baseball Tournament will be held from May 24 through May 28 at Reckling Park in Houston. The annual tournament determines the tournament champion of Division I Conference USA in college baseball. The tournament champion will then earn the conference's automatic bid to the 2023 NCAA Division I Baseball Tournament.

The tournament has been held every year since 1996, except for 2020, due to the COVID-19 pandemic. The Rice Owls has claimed seven championships, the most of any school, with the Owls latest win in 2017.

Format and seeding
The tournament will consist the top eight teams in regular season play. The top three teams in each division will receive automatic bid, plus two teams with the best winning percentage regardless of division will receive at-large bids. The format will consist of two double-elimination brackets, with a single-elimination championship game.

Bracket and results

References

2023 Conference USA baseball season
Conference USA Baseball Tournament
Conference USA Baseball Tournament
College sports tournaments in Texas
Baseball competitions in Houston
2023 in Houston